Anne Berit Andersen (born 2 December 1951 in Søgne) is a Norwegian politician for the Conservative Party.

She was elected to the Norwegian Parliament from Vest-Agder in 2001, but was not re-elected in 2005. She served in the position of deputy representative during the terms 1997–2001 and 2005–2009.

Andersen was mayor of Søgne from 1991 to 2001.

References

1951 births
Living people
People from Søgne
Conservative Party (Norway) politicians
Mayors of places in Vest-Agder
Women mayors of places in Norway
Members of the Storting
21st-century Norwegian politicians
21st-century Norwegian women politicians
Women members of the Storting